Stipecoma is a genus of flowering plants in the family Apocynaceae, first described as a genus in 1860. It contains only one known species, Stipecoma peltigera, native to Brazil and Bolivia.

formerly included in the genus
 Stipecoma macrocalyx (Müll.Arg.) Miers = Peltastes macrocalyx (Müll.Arg.) Woodson
 Stipecoma mucronata Miers = Peltastes peltatus (Vell.) Woodson
 Stipecoma ovata Miers = Peltastes peltatus (Vell.) Woodson
 Stipecoma parabolica Miers = Peltastes peltatus (Vell.) Woodson
 Stipecoma peltata (Vell.) Miers = Peltastes peltatus (Vell.) Woodson
 Stipecoma plicata (A.DC.) Miers = Peltastes peltatus (Vell.) Woodson
 Stipecoma pulchra Miers = Peltastes pulcher (Miers) J.F.Morales
 Stipecoma speciosa Miers = Peltastes peltatus (Vell.) Woodson

References

Flora of South America
Monotypic Apocynaceae genera
Echiteae